The men's open 2000 metres event in indoor rowing at the 2017 World Games took place on the 26 July 2017 at the Multifunctional Hall in Jelcz-Laskowice.

Results 
GR = Games Record

References 

Indoor rowing at the 2017 World Games